Rim Khong (lit. "By the Mekong") is a tambon (subdistrict) of Chiang Khong District, in Chiang Rai Province, Thailand. In 2015 it had a population of 7,055 people.

History
The subdistrict was created effective 19 June 1990 by splitting off five administrative villages from Wiang.

Administration

Central administration
The tambon is divided into 10 administrative villages (mubans).

Local administration
The area of the subdistrict is covered by the subdistrict administrative organization (SAO) Rim Khong (องค์การบริหารส่วนตำบลริมโขง).

References

External links
Thaitambon.com on Rim Khong

Tambon of Chiang Rai province
Populated places in Chiang Rai province